The Laguna 30 is an American sailboat that was designed by W. Shad Turner as a cruiser and first built in 1983.

The Laguna 30 design was developed into the Laguna 33 in 1986, with the addition of a reverse transom.

Production
The design was built by Laguna Yachts in the United States, between 1983 and 1987, but it is now out of production.

Design
The Laguna 30 is a recreational keelboat, built predominantly of fiberglass, with wood trim. It has a masthead sloop rig, a raked stem, a plumb transom, an internally mounted spade-type rudder controlled by a wheel and a fixed fin keel. It displaces  and carries  of ballast.

The design has sleeping accommodation for seven people, with a double "V"-berth in the bow cabin, an "U"-shaped settee around a drop-down dinette table and a straight settee in the main cabin, plus an aft cabin with a double berth on the starboard side. The galley is located on the port side at the companionway ladder. The galley is "U"-shaped and is equipped with a two-burner stove, an ice box and a double sink. A navigation station is opposite the galley, on the starboard side. The head is located just aft of the bow cabin on the port side.

See also
List of sailing boat types

References

External links
Laguna 30 tour video

Keelboats
1980s sailboat type designs
Sailing yachts
Sailboat type designs by W. Shad Turner
Sailboat types built by Laguna Yachts